Royal Air Force Peplow or more simply RAF Peplow is a former Royal Air Force located in Shropshire, England.

The following units were here at some point:
 No. 5 Service Flying Training School RAF
 No. 11 Service Flying Training School RAF
 No. 21 (Pilots) Advanced Flying Unit RAF
 No. 83 Operational Training Unit RAF
 734 Naval Air Squadron
 758 Naval Air Squadron
 772 Naval Air Squadron
 780 Naval Air Squadron
 798 Naval Air Squadron
 No. 1515 (Beam Approach Training) Flight RAF

References

Peplow